Champlain Valley Physicians Hospital (CVPH) is a hospital located in Plattsburgh, New York.

Champlain Valley Physicians' Hospital was created in 1972 by the merger of the private Physician's Hospital with Champlain Valley Hospital, a charitable hospital operated by the Grey Nuns.  As UVM Health Network - Champlain Valley Physicians Hospital, it is currently a not-for-profit facility incorporating a variety of inpatient, outpatient, and community outreach care services, including an oncology center, a nursing home unit, renal dialysis center, adult and child/adolescent mental health wards, and medical and surgical capabilities.  In recent years, the cardiology services provided by Lake Champlain Cardiology Associates have expanded to include coronary interventional care provided by Champlain Valley Cardiology and open-heart surgery, provided by Champlain Valley Cardiothoracic Surgeons.  The hospital also has a variety of diagnostic and rehabilitation services.

In 2012, CVPH Medical Center joined Fletcher Allen Partners, now the University of Vermont Health Network.

References

Hospitals in New York (state)
Charitable hospitals

Trauma centers